William Bottrell (1816–1881) was born at Rafta, St Levan in Cornwall on 7 March 1816. He contributed greatly to the preservation of Cornish mythology. Both he and Thomas Quiller Couch contributed folk stories of West Cornwall for Robert Hunt's Popular Romances of the West of England, published in 1865.

Although Bottrell's contributions were acknowledged in Hunt's introduction to the book (his name given there as Botterell), there was no individual acknowledgement for each story, which was the case for Couch's contributions. The "Cornish Telegraph" invited Bottrell to write his own versions for their newspaper. These were published between 1867 and 1869 and then published as Traditions and Hearthside Stories of West Cornwall in 1870.

Hunt and Bottrell were both intent on preserving the old legends but Bottrell's stories were generally much longer than similar versions published by Hunt, reflecting the way the old story tellers, known as "droll tellers", embellished the basic tales to increase the entertainment value.

A second series of Traditions and Hearthside Stories of West Cornwall was published in 1873, included the first recorded version of the Mermaid of Zennor. In 1880, a third series was in preparation when Bottrell had a stroke that left him unable to write. A shorter than intended volume was completed as Stories and Folk-Lore of West Cornwall  with a preface by Rev. W. S. Lach-Szyrma, which included much that had been previously published. Bottrell died in St Ives on 27 August 1881 and was buried in St Levan churchyard.

References

External links

 

1816 births
1881 deaths
British folklorists
Burials in Cornwall
Cornish folklore
Folklore writers
Writers about Cornwall